Thomas Bhalerao (1 February 1933 – 13 February 2015
) was an Indian Jesuit priest and, from 1987, the Roman Catholic bishop of Nashik.

Ordained to the priesthood in the Society of Jesus in 1965, Bhalerao was named bishop of the Roman Catholic Diocese of Nashik, India, in 1987. He resigned in 2007.

Notes

External links

Profile of Mons. Bhalerao www.catholic-hierarchy.org 

1933 births
2015 deaths
20th-century Indian Jesuits
21st-century Roman Catholic bishops in India
20th-century Roman Catholic bishops in India